This is a list of the Brazilian states by highest point, including Distrito Federal. The highest point in Brazil is Pico da Neblina, in Amazonas, at 2,994 metres (9,822 feet), which ranks the country as 69th by highest point. Several of the peaks in the list are unnamed, and are better known by the mountain range in which they are located.

References 

 
Highest point
Brazilian states
Brazil
Brazil, highest point